John Richard Murtagh (born 21 July 1967) is a New Zealand cricketer.

A middle-order batsman, Murtagh captained the New Zealand Under-19 team in three Youth Tests and three Youth ODIs against the Australian under-19 team in 1986/87. However, he played only six matches at first-class level, between 1989 and 1992. His best match was in January 1992, when he made 41 and 44 for Wellington against Auckland.

See also
 List of Otago representative cricketers

References

External links
 

1967 births
Living people
New Zealand cricketers
Otago cricketers
Wellington cricketers
New Zealand Youth One Day International captains
New Zealand Youth Test captains
People from Geraldine, New Zealand
Cricketers from Canterbury, New Zealand